Stephen Thomas Curwood (born in Roxbury, Massachusetts on December 11, 1947) is a journalist, author, public radio personality and actor.

In 1970, as a writer for the Boston Phoenix, Steve broke the story that Polaroid's instant photo system was key to the apartheid pass system in South Africa.  Steve moved on to The Boston Globe as an investigative reporter and columnist and shared the 1975 Pulitzer Prize for Public Service as part of The Boston Globes education team.

His production credits in public broadcasting include reporter and host for NPR's Weekend All Things Considered, host of NPR's World of Opera, producer for the PBS series The Advocates with Michael Dukakis, and creator, host and executive producer of Living on Earth, the prize-winning weekly environmental radio program heard for more than  years on public radio stations   and distributed by Public Radio International (PRI) since 2006.

Acting roles include Randall in the Loeb Drama Center's production of Slow Dance on the Killing Ground.

Curwood lives at his family's farm in the Seacoast region of New Hampshire .

Curwood is the author of a book, An Uncommon Hero: One Mother Who Fought to Protect Her Child from Sexual Abuse.

References

External links 
 Sarah Thomas Curwood bio. - mother of Steve Curwood

1947 births
Living people
American columnists
American investigative journalists
American male journalists
American Quakers
American radio personalities
American reporters and correspondents
The Boston Globe people
NPR personalities
Public Radio International personalities
Journalists from Ohio
Westtown School alumni
Harvard College alumni